Rhodora was a section of subgenus Pentanthera in the genus Rhododendron, that has since been discontinued. It comprised two species, both deciduous shrubs native to eastern North America:
Rhododendron canadense
Rhododendron vaseyi

Description 
The section was closely related to sect. Pentanthera, differing from it in the flower corolla having only three lobes, rather than five, the upper three lobes of sect. Pentanthera being joined into a single three-lipped lobe in sect. Rhodora.

Taxonomy 
The distinct floral structure resulted in Rhodora being treated as a distinct genus at one time. Treating it as such though resulted in the remainder of the genus Rhododendron being paraphyletic. However detailed phylogenetic analysis revealed that Rhodora was not a distinct entity, but rather polyphyletic, and it was disassembled, each species being allocated to other sections. Rhododendron canadense was moved to section Pentanethera, subgenus Hymenanthes and Rhododendron vaseyi was moved to section Sciadorhodion, which then became a new section of subgenus Azaleastrum.

References

Bibliography 
Germplasm Resources Information Network: Rhododendron sect. Rhodora
Huxley, A., ed. (1992). New RHS Dictionary of Gardening. Macmillan.
 

Rhodora
Plant sections
Historically recognized plant taxa

da:Rhododendron canadense